Javier 'Javi' Barral García (born 30 September 1981 in Madrid) is a Spanish former professional footballer who played as a left-back.

References

External links

1981 births
Living people
Spanish footballers
Footballers from Madrid
Association football defenders
Segunda División players
Segunda División B players
Tercera División players
Real Madrid C footballers
AD Alcorcón footballers
UD San Sebastián de los Reyes players
Atlético Levante UD players
Real Oviedo players
CD Guadalajara (Spain) footballers
CE Sabadell FC footballers
CF Fuenlabrada footballers